The Toyota Premier Cup was a single-game cup competition organized by the Toyota and Football Association of Thailand and was first played in 2011. It features the winners of the Thai League Cup and an invited team from the J1 League. The competition sponsor was Toyota Motor (Thailand) Co., Ltd. Since 2018 Toyota, sponsor for this tournament decided to abolished the tournament.

Results

Performance by club

Performance by nation

Participating by club

Bold = winners

References

News from Goal.com(Thailand). Buriram United invitation to 2016 Mekong Club Championship and SCG Muangthong United invitation to 2017 Toyota Premier Cup.
Official news from SCG Muangthong United's website. SCG Muangthong United invitation to 2017 Toyota Premier Cup.
News from Buggaboo.tv(Channel 7 Thailand). Buriram United invitation to 2016 Mekong Club Championship and SCG Muangthong United invitation to 2017 Toyota Premier Cup.
News from Workpoint TV(Broadcast Thailand television). Buriram United invitation to 2016 Mekong Club Championship and SCG Muangthong United invitation to 2017 Toyota Premier Cup.
News from SCG Muangthong United's fan club website. SCG Muangthong United invitation to 2017 Toyota Premier Cup.

  
Football cup competitions in Thailand
Recurring sporting events established in 2011
2011 establishments in Thailand
Recurring sporting events disestablished in 2017